Adriana Evans is the self-titled debut studio album by American neo soul artist Adriana Evans, released on April 15, 1997, through Loud Records.

All of the tracks on the album were written and produced by rapper Dred Scott and Evans. The album made it to two Billboard charts, doing fairly well on the Top R&B/Hip-Hop Albums and the Top Heatseekers, though it did not chart on the Billboard 200. Two singles also made it to the Billboard charts, "Love is All Around" peaking at #65 and "Seein' is Believing" at #50 on Billboards Top R&B Singles chart.

Track listing
All tracks written by Adriana Evans and Johnathan "Dred" Scott

Credits
Producer – Jonathan "Dred" Scott
Producer [Additional] – Adriana Evans (tracks: 1 to 4, 6, 7, 9, 11)
Co-producer – Rastine Calhoun (tracks: 1 to 4, 6, 7, 9, 11)

Personnel 

 Duane Benjamin – trombone
 Gary Bias – baritone sax
 Kevin Brandon – bass
 Sekou Bunch – bass
 Bette Byers – viola
 Rastine Calhoun III – flute, arranger, conductor, tenor sax, producer, arp
 Mark Cargill – violin
 Susan Chatman – violin
 Andy Cleaves – trumpet, flugelhorn
 Luis Conte – percussion, conga
 Craig T. Cooper – guitar
 Evette Devereaux – violin
 Adriana Evans – vocals, producer
 Michael Allen Harrison – violin
 William Henderson – violin
 Herman Jackson – keyboards, fender rhodes
 Grant Lou – art direction, design
 Miguel Martinez – cello
 Eric McKain – percussion, tambourine, claves
 Myron McKinley – piano
 Wil Miller – trumpet, flugelhorn
 Joseph Mitchell – bells, orchestral bells
 Jorge Moragu – viola
 Patrick Morgan – violin
 Greg Mull – engineer
 Charles Owens – flute, oboe
 Eric Sanafin – mixing
 Harry Scorzo – violin
 Dred Scott – producer
 Jacqueline Suzuki – violin
 Robert L. Watt – French horn
 Jerome Webster – violin
 Gregory Williams – French horn
 Hershel Wise – viola

Charts

Singles

References

External links
 Adrian Evans - Adriana Evans (Vinyl, LP Album)

1997 debut albums
Adriana Evans albums
Albums produced by Dred Scott (musician)
Loud Records albums
RCA Records albums